The American 1000 Guineas was an American Thoroughbred horse race held annually at Arlington Park in Arlington Heights, Illinois.

Inaugurated in 2008, the race was open to three-year-old fillies and was contested on turf over a distance of one mile (eight furlongs). 

The race was dropped from Arlington Park's stakes schedule for 2011.

Records
Speed  record:
 1:37.59 - Consequence (2009)

Most wins by an owner:
 No owner has won this race more than once.

Most wins by a jockey:
 No jockey has won this race more than once.

Most wins by a trainer:
 No trainer has won this race more than once.

Winners

References
 The 2009 American 1000 Guineas at Arlington Park.com

Flat horse races for three-year-olds
Ungraded stakes races in the United States
Turf races in the United States
Recurring sporting events established in 2008
Arlington Park
Horse races in Illinois
2008 establishments in Illinois